Moupal Deshpran Vidyapith is a public high school  established in 1928. The school got recognition 25 years later in  1955. The people whose only desire was to spread education among the common people kindled the light of education through the foundation of this school.

Infrastructure 
Infrastructural development is  heading parallel with academic advancement. In 2006, a school-attached hostel was set up for the SC & ST students. At present 74 students reside at our school hostel and it helps to propel the quality of progress. In the session 2006–07, keeping in mind the demand of time, the Vocational Stream was introduced. These job-oriented courses raised the name of our school and the pass outs are engaged in different carrier-based jobs. Moreover, self-employment is another key to success among these students. In the year 2010, the Higher Secondary section was introduced with Science and Humanities Streams. The initiation has been done but there is still a lot to progress.

References

1928 establishments in British India
High schools and secondary schools in West Bengal
Schools in Paschim Medinipur district
Educational institutions established in 1928